Vinko Rosić (May 22, 1941 – June 9, 2006) was a Croatian water polo player. As a member of Yugoslavia's water polo team he won a silver medal at the 1964 Summer Olympics.

See also
 List of Olympic medalists in water polo (men)

References

External links
 

1941 births
2006 deaths
Water polo players from Split, Croatia
Croatian male water polo players
Yugoslav male water polo players
Olympic medalists in water polo
Olympic silver medalists for Yugoslavia
Olympic water polo players of Yugoslavia
Water polo players at the 1964 Summer Olympics
Medalists at the 1964 Summer Olympics